Waitemata was a New Zealand parliamentary electorate, from 1871 to 1946, and then from 1954 to 1978. It was represented by 18 members of parliament.

Population centres
It was located north of the various urban Auckland electorates and south of the  electorate. The following settlements were included in its initial area: Cornwallis, Huia, Parau, Laingholm, Titirangi, Waiatarua, Oratia, Piha, Henderson Valley, Swanson, Rānui, Waitākere township, Taupaki, Kumeu, Hobsonville, Whenuapai, Takapuna, and Helensville.

There was no adjustments in the number of electorates between the South and North Islands, but the law changes resulted in boundary adjustments to almost every electorate through the 1952 electoral redistribution; only five electorates were unaltered. Five electorates were reconstituted (including Waitemata) and one was newly created, and a corresponding six electorates were abolished; all of these in the North Island.

History
The electorate existed from 1871 to 1946, and from 1954 to 1978.

Early members were Thomas Henderson 1871–1874 (resigned), Gustav von der Heyde 1874–1875 (unseated on petition), John Sangster Macfarlane 1876–1879 (defeated), Reader Wood 1879–1881 (retired), William John Hurst 1881–1886 (died), Richard Monk 1886–1890 (defeated), and Jackson Palmer 1890–1893 (defeated).

Richard Monk held the electorate for the period 1896–1902. The seat was then held by Ewen Alison from 1902 to 1908, Leonard Phillips from 1908 to 1911, and Alexander Harris from 1911 to 1935.

In 1946 Henry Thorne Morton, who had held the seat from 1943, was defeated for North Shore.

Members of Parliament
Waitemata was represented by 18 Members of Parliament.

Key

Election results

1975 election

1972 election

1969 election

1966 election

1963 election

1960 election

1957 election

1954 election

1943 election

1941 by-election

1938 election

1935 election

1931 election

1928 election

1925 election

1922 election

1919 election

1914 election

1911 election

1908 election

1905 election

1902 election

1899 election

1894 by-election

1890 election

1886 Waitemata by-election

September 1874 Waitemata by-election

July 1874 Waitemata by-election

Notes

References

Historical electorates of New Zealand
Politics of the Auckland Region
1870 establishments in New Zealand
1946 disestablishments in New Zealand
1978 disestablishments in New Zealand
1954 establishments in New Zealand